Frame is an unincorporated community in Kanawha County, West Virginia, United States.

The community was named after a local blacksmith with the surname Frame.

References 

Unincorporated communities in West Virginia
Unincorporated communities in Kanawha County, West Virginia